Cáceres Railway Station is the main railway station of Cáceres, Spain.

Services that use the station include Media Distancia services to Badajoz, Mérida and Madrid Atocha. Services on line 74 using the Mérida-Los Rosales line mostly terminate here to/from Seville Santa Justa.

See also 
 Madrid−Valencia de Alcántara railway

References

Railway stations in Spain opened in 1880
Buildings and structures in Cáceres, Spain
Transport in Extremadura